The Butcher[s Daughter  is a French film directed by Christopher Thompson (actor) in 2021. It had a cinema release in France the 18 January 2022.

Plot
On the death of her father, Charly Fleury inherits the family butcher's shop. Editor-in-chief of a fashion magazine, she prefers to sell the business as soon as possible. Martial, her father's former assistant manager, decides to fight to recover the butcher's shop. While everything opposes them, Charly and Martial will have to learn live together.

Cast
 Géraldine Pailhas : Charly Fleury
 Arnaud Ducret : Martial Toussaint
 Alison Wheeler : Carole Katayan
 Stéphane De Groodt : Miguel Amestoy
 Jean-François Stévenin : Jacques Fleury
 Antoine Gouy : Yves de la Closerie
 Élisa Ruschke : Julia
 Anne Le Ny : Madame Keller
 Antony Hickling : Sid Kharish

References

External links
 

French romantic comedy films
2021 films
2020s French films